Kia Byers (born October 6, 1987 in Regina, Saskatchewan) is a Canadian sprint kayaker who has competed since 2000. She won a bronze medal in the K-1 4 x 200 m event at the 2009 ICF Canoe Sprint World Championships in Dartmouth.

Byers also won a gold medal at the 2007 Pan American Games in the women's K-2 500 m event, alongside Marie-Christine Schmidt.

Kia has been a carded member of the Canadian National team since 2006 competing at the World Championships since 2009. 
She has been number one in the K-1 200m event since 2009, racing it at each World Championships since.

References
Canadian Olympic Committee profile
Canoe09.ca profile

1987 births
Living people
Canadian female canoeists
Canoeists at the 2007 Pan American Games
Sportspeople from Regina, Saskatchewan
University of Regina alumni
University of Saskatchewan alumni
ICF Canoe Sprint World Championships medalists in kayak
Pan American Games gold medalists for Canada
Pan American Games medalists in canoeing
Medalists at the 2007 Pan American Games
21st-century Canadian women
20th-century Canadian women